Exaeretini is a tribe of plant bugs in the family Miridae. There are more than 20 genera in Exaeretini.

Genera
These 24 genera belong to the tribe Exaeretini:

 Anonychiella Reuter, 1912 - Palearctic
 Aphaenophyes Reuter, 1899 - Palearctic
 Atractotomimus Kiritshenko, 1952 - Palearctic
 Auchenocrepis Fieber, 1858 - Palearctic
 Brendaphylus Yasunaga, 2013 - Orient
 Camptotylus Fieber, 1860 - Palearctic
 Camptozorus Kerzhner, 1996 - Palearctic
 Chrysochnoodes Reuter, 1901 - Palearctic
 Compsonannus Reuter, 1902 - Palearctic
 Eumecotarsus Kerzhner, 1962 - Palearctic
 Eurycranella Reuter, 1904 - Palearctic
 Frotaphylus Carvalho, 1984 - Neotropics
 Gonoporomiris Henry & Schuh, 2002 - Neotropics
 Hadrophyes Puton, 1874 - Palearctic
 Hyalopsallus Carvalho & Schaffner, 1973 - Neotropics
 Megalodactylus Fieber, 1858 - Palearctic
 Moissonia Reuter, 1894 - Circumtropical
 Opuna Kirkaldy, 1902 - Orient, Pacific Islands
 Pastocoris Reuter, 1879 - Palearctic
 Psallopsis Reuter, 1901 - Palearctic
 Randallopsallus Yasunaga, 2013 - Orient
 Tuponia Reuter, 1875 - Palearctic
 Voruchiella Poppius, 1912 - Palearctic
 Yotvata Linnavuori, 1964 - Palearctic

References

Phylinae